Nikos Pantazopoulos (born 1973) is an Australian artist and lecturer at RMIT University.

Education 
Nikos Pantazopoulos earned a Bachelor of Fine Arts in Photography at the Victorian College of the Arts in 1998. He earned a Master of Fine Arts at Goldsmiths, University of London, and a PhD at Monash University in 2013.

Art 
Pantazopoulos' work deals primarily with his background as a Greek and a gay man, especially through the lens of ancient Greek culture and homosexuality in ancient Greece. His photographic work "Hairy Arse" explored standards of male beauty and Classical Greek culture.

Pantazopoulos' work was included in the "Queer Economies" program at the Centre for Contemporary Photography, and at the 2020 "Friendship as a Way of Life" exhibit at the University of New South Wales. He has also been exhibited at The Substation and the Westspace Gallery. His style has been described as borrowing from Minimalism.

Personal life 
Pantazopoulos is openly gay and a Greek Australian.

References 

Australian people of Greek descent
21st-century Australian photographers
Photographers from Melbourne
Australian LGBT photographers
Gay photographers
1973 births
Living people
Victorian College of the Arts alumni
Alumni of Goldsmiths, University of London
Monash University alumni
21st-century Australian male artists